Anayo Modestus Onyekwere   popularly known as Kanayo O. Kanayo   (born 1 March 1962) is a Nigerian actor and lawyer. In 2006, he won the African Movie Academy Award for Best Actor in a Leading Role for his performance in the movie Family Battle.

Early life and education 
Kanayo was born on 1 March 1962, he is a native of Nru Umueze Oboama Ezinihitte in Mbaise Local Government Area of Imo State. He was raised in Aba, Abia State and attended St. Joseph primary school. He had his secondary education at Secondary Technical School, Aba. He obtained a diploma in Mass Communication, a diploma in Law and a graduate degree in philosophy from the University of Lagos. He also obtained a master's degree in political sciences. He also obtained a Law degree from the University of Abuja in 2018 and was called to the Nigerian Bar in 2020.

Career 
Kanayo started his acting career in 1982, acting in productions by the Nigerian Television Authority. He made his debut movie appearance in the year 1992 in the film Living in Bondage. He has starred in over 100 films and was nominated in 2008 for African Movie Academy Award for Best Actor for his role in the movie Across the Niger.His most recent movies are Up North and Living in Bondage: Breaking Free.

In 2011, he contested for the Chair of Imo State House of Representatives but lost. In 2018, he contested for representative of Ahiazu/Ezinihitte Mbaise in the Federal House Of Representatives under the political party APGA but lost.

He has featured in multiple Nollywood productions including Lion Heart and the sitcom Professor Johnbull, however, he is known for playing the role of a Villain in these productions especially in films relating to occultic practices.

He has received the order of the MFR.

Kanayo was among various Nigerians honored by the government in 2014 during the centenary celebration.

Politics 
Kanayo declared his interest on 6 June 2018 to represent the Ahiazu/Ezinihitte Mbaise Federal Constituency of Imo State at the House of Representatives the following election year which was 2019. He made this know to the public, stating he was going to be under the All Progressives Grand Alliance (APGA). He lost the election but was expected to run the next election year (2023).

Kanayo disclosed in 2022 he was not contesting for any position in politics and said, "I will not contest for any political office in 2023. This sacrifice is to enable me to work for a Nigerian President of Igbo extraction."

Filmography

Films

TV shows

Awards and nominations

See also
 List of Nigerian actors
 Nigerian Law School

References

External links
 
 

1962 births
Living people
Male actors from Imo State
Nigerian male film actors
Igbo male actors
Best Actor Africa Movie Academy Award winners
20th-century Nigerian male actors
21st-century Nigerian male actors
Members of the Order of the Niger
Actors from Imo State
University of Lagos alumni
People from Mbaise
Nigerian actor-politicians
University of Abuja alumni
Nigerian male television actors